The following article presents a summary of the 1966 football (soccer) season in Brazil, which was the 65th season of competitive football in the country.

Taça Brasil

Semifinals

Final

Cruzeiro declared as the Taça Brasil champions by aggregate score of 9–4.

Torneio Rio-São Paulo

The final stage of the competition, played in a round-robin format between the four best placed teams in the first stage was not played, as the teams did not want to field reserve players, and the national team was preparing for the World Cup. Thus, the four best placed teams, which are Botafogo, Santos, Vasco da Gama and Corinthians, were declared as Torneio Rio-São Paulo champions.

State championship champions

Brazilian clubs in international competitions

Brazil national team
The following table lists all the games played by the Brazil national football team in official competitions and friendly matches during 1966.

References

 Brazilian competitions at RSSSF
 1966 Brazil national team matches at RSSSF

 
Seasons in Brazilian football
Brazil